Taillancourt is a commune in the Meuse department in Grand Est in north-eastern France.

Taillancourt is located in south-eastern department of Meuse. Bordering the Vosges and the south of the Meurthe and Moselle in the east, its axis the Meuse Valley. We also call the "Valley of color."

See also
 Communes of the Meuse department

References

Communes of Meuse (department)